Scabinus, sometimes translated as alderman or assessor, was a medieval and early modern municipal office in Continental Europe.

It continued into the present day under a variety of vernacular names:

 échevin or eschevin in French
 scabino in Italian
 Schöffe in German
 Schäffe in Luxembourgish
 schepen in Dutch
 šepmistr in Czech

The equivalent office in southern France and Catalonia was consul or, in Toulouse, capitoul.